{{Infobox comic strip
|title=U.S. Acres
|altnames=Orson's Place (Canada)Orson's Farm (other countries)
|image=Us acres.jpg
|caption=U.S. Acres logo featuring the strip's main character Orson
|creator=Jim DavisBrett Koth
|owner = Paws, Inc.
|website= 
|current=
|status= Concluded
|syndicate=United Feature Syndicate
|genre=Humor
|preceded by= Garfield (1978–present)
|first=March 3, 1986
|last= Original print run ended April 14, 1989. Reruns ran on Garfield.com from 2010 to 2020.
}}U.S. Acres (known as Orson's Farm outside the United States and as Orson's Place in Canada) was an American comic strip that originally ran from 1986 to 1989, created by Jim Davis, author of the comic strip Garfield.U.S. Acres was launched on March 3, 1986 in a then-unprecedented 505 newspapers by United Feature Syndicate. For most of the last year of the strip's existence, Brett Koth, who had been assisting Davis on Garfield at that time, was given co-creator's credit in the strip, and signed his name to the strips along with Davis. The strip was centered on a group of barnyard animals, with the main character being Orson, a small pig who had been taken from his mother shortly after being born.

At the peak of the comic's popularity, there were children's books, plush animals (particularly of the characters Roy, Booker, Sheldon, and Orson), and posters of the main characters. Shirts, mugs, mousepads, and keychains of the characters would later be available. An animated adaptation was included in the TV show Garfield and Friends, as a spin-off segment, and continued to be so for several years after the strip ended, which was even lampshaded in one of the final strips. The final daily strip was printed on April 15, 1989, while the final Sunday appeared on May 7, 1989. Most papers only ran the Sunday strip, usually in the same page as Garfield.

The strip was relaunched as an online webcomic on October 1, 2010, and was announced the day before in a question and answer column in USA Today. Later, in celebration of U.S. Acres's twenty-fourth anniversary, the strips prior to August 1, 1986 were released on Garfield.com. On August 7, 2016, a Garfield comic strip showed the U.S. Acres gang (sans Bo and Blue) in its logo box, featuring Garfield eating a bag of chicken feed.

In August 2019, Jim Davis sold the rights to U.S. Acres to Paramount Global (formerly ViacomCBS) as part of its acquisition of Paws, Inc. In April 2020, the strip was removed from GoComics. On June 19, 2020, Garfield.com shut down, redirecting to Nickelodeon's website. As a result, the strip was removed as well as the webcomic being discontinued entirely. Garfield.com was later resurrected with a limited number of selected Garfield comics, but US Acres was not available on the new website.

Characters
The primary traits of the cartoon's main characters were established during the run of the comic strip, even down to such visual gags as the head on Wade's inner tube having the same facial expression as Wade.

Primary characters

Orson Pig
Orson Pig (voiced by Gregg Berger): A good-natured yet naïve pig whose work ethic makes him the functional leader. His good humor being tested is one of the common gags in the cartoons. Originally, Orson had long eyelashes (to represent him as a young piglet) until they permanently disappeared on December 31, 1987 (albeit permanently on January 3, 1988). Booker and Sheldon called him Mom (though it was inconsistent because at other times they just call him Orson). Being the runt of his litter, Orson's original owner intended to get rid of him. Orson fell from the pick-up taking him away from his birthplace and moved to the farm known as U.S. Acres. and was later found by a farm girl who persuaded Orson to follow her to her father's farm. Orson's alter-ego is a costumed superhero named Power Pig, which more often than not causes his friends or adversaries to fall down laughing at him. Orson loves books, but is very influenced by them, by sometimes doing what's in the book.  Sometimes when Orson reads a book, particularly a scary one, the stuff he reads about usually appears behind him and scares the others away. He was also originally going to make a cameo in The Garfield Show, but was cut due to the international laws prohibiting cartoons from featuring talking pigs out of concern of offending Malaysian audiences. Orson also dislikes Roy.

Roy Rooster
Roy Rooster (voiced by Thom Huge): The strip's antihero. Roy is a loud, wisecracking rooster who endlessly enjoys practical jokes with Wade being his favorite target. With few exceptions he is tolerated because his job of waking up everyone and 'tending' to the chickens is important, but he does his best to avoid labor whenever possible. In the cartoon, he is more well-liked by the others and is often the one to defeat the series antagonists such as Orson's brothers. In spite of his lazy nature, Roy has proven to be a very capable protector of the chickens, coolly outsmarting and defeating the predators, such as the Weasel and the Fox, that try to kidnap them with a series of practical jokes and gags. He is also serious about being a cartoon star and does whatever he can to remain in the spotlight. Even though he is a jerk and insults everyone, Roy is not a bully and doesn’t really mean any harm. He is allergic to flowers, a fact that was first established in a strip published on July 2, 1986.

Wade Duck
Wade Duck (voiced by Howard Morris): Wade is the "cowardly craven duck" of the farm. His good nature is sometimes shadowed by his overwhelming hypochondria and panphobia. Wade is always seen wearing a kiddie pool flotation inner tube, which (as part of a continuous running gag) has a duck head in front of it that shares 
the same facial expressions as Wade – even down to the direction in which Wade is looking. He lost his fears as part of his final appearance on April 12, 1989.

Booker
Booker (voiced by Frank Welker): A chick named by Orson for the pig's love of books. Booker and Sheldon were still eggs when Orson found them abandoned and decided to hatch them. Booker is extremely adventurous and (over) confident despite his size. He often chases worms, but can never seem to catch them. In the comic, he often called Orson "Mom."

Sheldon
Sheldon (voiced by Frank Welker): Booker's twin brother, who decided not to hatch. He becomes very philosophical and introspective over the course of the strip, and begins musing on his "Sanctum Sanctorum" (a small mound of grass). A recurring gag has him describe his shell as the perfect living space, which is never shown.

Bo Sheep
Bo Sheep (voiced by Frank Welker): Lanolin's brother. In the comics, he is unintelligent and perky.  However, in the TV series, he is not usually bright but always calm, cool, collected, dependable, and a skillful cook who speaks with a Southern Californian dialect.

Lanolin Sheep
Lanolin Sheep (voiced by Julie Payne): Usually shown as a hard worker, but with a personality the polar opposite of her brother: loud and disagreeable. Her name is that of the grease produced by wool-bearing animals, such as sheep. In the comic strip, she is much more abrasive than in the television series.

Secondary characters
 Filbert (voiced by Howard Morris): A worm Booker often chases, but with no success. He lives in a hole with his wife Estelle and their son Willy.
 Cody: A dog who takes pleasure in chasing the barnyard's animals and trying to maul them. He was eventually removed from the strip without any explanation and does not appear in Garfield and Friends. His final appearance was on September 13, 1988.
 Blue: A blue cat who is friends with Cody and keeps him in line. She disappeared from the strip after March 28, 1988.
 Mort, Gort, & Wart (voiced by Frank Welker, Thom Huge, and Howard Morris, respectively): Orson's three larger, meaner brothers who play a much bigger role in the animated series than did in the comic strip, where they are unnamed. They stop appearing in the strip after Orson was taken away from his mother. They appear as tormentors to Orson as well as frequent burglars of the farm's crops in the animated series. Their leitmotif in the series samples the melody of the classical piece "In the Hall of the Mountain King".
 Max the Skateboarding Bird: An eccentric, flightless bird that first appears as a mysterious creature in a wall to whom Wade speaks on October 13, 1986. Jim Davis solicited ideas from readers (specifically children) as to what they thought the creature might be. On March 3, 1987, Davis revealed his choice in the strip. Max does not appear again following the week.
 The Weasel (voiced by Gregg Berger): A television-exclusive character who often tries to kidnap the chickens so that he can eat them, but is usually stopped by Roy. The only other regularly recurring antagonist (even though he never appears in the strip), he occasionally attempts to catch and eat Sheldon as well.
 Fido the Bull: A mean bull that lives in the barnyard.
 The Worms: Random worms that Booker chases.

 Cut characters 

There are two characters that were cut from the final strip: a calf named Chuck and a horse named Jodie. Even though they never saw the light of day, they did appear on a sticker sheet released during the strip’s run. The August 7, 2016 strip of Garfield included them in the top panel, albeit with Chuck colored black.

Comic strip collections
Five comic strip collections were published, by Topper Books of New York City.

 (1986-03-03 through 1986-10-04)
 (1986-10-05 through (1987-05-09)
 (1987-05-10 through 1987-12-13)
 (1987-12-14 through 1988-07-17)
 (1988-07-18 through 1989-02-18)

Also, at least six comic strip collections were published by Berkley Books of New York City.  However, some of these books are missing months of the strip and / or have strips out of order.

 (1986-05-24 through 1987-08-16)
 (1986-08-18 through 1986-11-03)

 (1987-04-14 through 1987-05-09, 1987-12-14 through 1988-02-08)

The final two months of U.S. Acres were not published as part of an American collection. The last U.S. Acres collection was published in England as a mass-market paperback, titled Orson's Farm Cuts the Corn. The collection, which has since gone out of print along with the rest of the U.S. Acres books, contains fifty-nine of the final sixty strips (one Sunday strip was not printed) and is the rarest of any U.S. Acres/Orson's Farm collection.

Children's booksWade Dives InWade's Haunted Halloween (from 1990)Happy Birthday, Sheldon''

References

External links
Archive of U.S. Acres at Garfield.com on its second to final day before removal
Archive of U.S. Acres at GoComics days before removal

Incomplete list of U.S. Acres books at Michigan State University Libraries – Special Collections Division – Reading Room Index to the Comic Art Collection – "U.S.A." to "U Zemlji"

Jim Davis (cartoonist)
1986 comics debuts
1989 comics endings
Comic strips started in the 1980s
Comics about pigs
Comics about ducks
Comics about birds
Comics about animals
Gag-a-day comics
Fictional farms
Comics set in the United States
Nickelodeon